Vinícius Gonçalves Rodrigues (born 28 November 1994) is a Brazilian Paralympic athlete. He won the silver medal in the men's 100 metres T63 event at the 2020 Summer Paralympics held in Tokyo, Japan. He also set a new T63 Paralympic record of 12.05 seconds.

References

External links
 

Living people
1994 births
Brazilian male sprinters
Paralympic medalists in athletics (track and field)
Athletes (track and field) at the 2020 Summer Paralympics
Medalists at the 2020 Summer Paralympics
Paralympic silver medalists for Brazil
Paralympic athletes of Brazil
Medalists at the World Para Athletics Championships
People from Maringá
Sportspeople from Paraná (state)
21st-century Brazilian people